This is a list of operational, offshore wind farms in Denmark (within the national maritime boundaries). Denmark's wind power generation is the highest in the world as a fraction of domestic consumption, reaching 47% in 2019.

Data is primarily from the 4C Offshore's Global Offshore Wind Farm Map and Database. Tariff data is supplied by the Danish Energy Agency.  The name of the Wind Farm is the name used by the Energy Company when referring to the Farm and is usually related to a shoal or the name of the nearest town on shore. The Wind Farm part is implied and hence omitted for ease of reading.

Current farms 

Capacity factors are averaged over each wind farm's life.

Future sites 
The list is sorted by capacity, but it can be sorted in any way by clicking once or twice on the triangle symbols ( Δ ) at the top in each column.

Past sites

Gallery

See also

Electricity sector in Denmark
List of wind farms
List of offshore wind farms
Lists of offshore wind farms by country
List of offshore wind farms in the North Sea
List of offshore wind farms in the Baltic Sea

References

Windfarm home pages

External links
 Map of current and coming Danish seaparks

Denmark